Live on Earth is the first live CD and DVD by Arjen Anthony Lucassen progressive metal project/supergroup Star One. It features songs from their debut album Space Metal, but also numerous songs from Lucassen's other project Ayreon.

The album was recorded live on 5 October 2002 at Lucky & Co in Rijssen, Netherlands by Andreas Grotenhoff (audial mobile-Recording studio, Germany) and is the first live album Lucassen had ever recorded.

Track listing

Disc one 
"Intro/Lift Off" - 1:34
"Set Your Controls" - 6:19
"High Moon" - 5:28
"Dreamtime" - 2:55
"Eyes of Time" - 3:50
"Songs of the Ocean" - 5:59
"Dawn of a Million Souls" - 5:17
"The Dream Sequencer" - 6:03
"Into the Black Hole" - 11:28
"Actual Fantasy" - 1:26
"Valley of the Queens" - 3:23

Disc two 
"Isis and Osiris" - 8:48
"Amazing Flight in Space" - 8:00
"Intergalactic Space Crusaders" - 5:15
"Castle Hall" - 4:58
"The Eye of Ra" - 9:16
"Starchild" - 9:22
"The Two Gates" - 14:35

Bonus DVD features 
Photo gallery
Behind the Scenes
"Space Truckin’" (Rijssen)
"Intergalactic Laxative" (Tilburg)
"Dreamtime" with Edward Reekers (Tilburg)
The DVD also comes with two extra tracks: a keyboard and a bass solo.

Personnel 
Sir Russell Allen - vocals
Damian Wilson - vocals
Robert Soeterboek - vocals
Floor Jansen - vocals
Arjen Anthony Lucassen - guitar
Joost van den Broek - keyboards
Peter Vink - bass
Ed Warby - drums
Irene Jansen - backing vocals

Special appearances 
Edward Reekers - vocals
Ewa Albering - flute

References

External links 
Star One's official homepage
 

Star One albums
2003 live albums
Inside Out Music live albums
Live video albums
2003 video albums
Inside Out Music video albums